Frankford is an unincorporated community in Greenbrier County, West Virginia, United States. Frankford is located on U.S. Route 219, south of Falling Spring and north of Maxwelton. Frankford has a post office with ZIP code 24938.

Frankford is the home of Frankford Elementary School and the Frankford Volunteer Fire Department.

The community derives its name from Frank Ludington, the original owner of the town site. Located near Frankford is Homeplace, listed on the National Register of Historic Places in 2007.

Notable people
 Alice Mary Dowd (1855–1943), educator, author
 Alexander F. Mathews, West Virginia banker.
 Henry M. Mathews, fifth governor of West Virginia.

See also
  Traveling 219: Frankford

References

Unincorporated communities in Greenbrier County, West Virginia
Unincorporated communities in West Virginia